Province flowers are species of plants selected to represent each province of Sweden. The origin of province flowers came from the American idea of state flowers, and was brought to Sweden by August Wickström and Paul Petter Waldenström in 1908. Waldenström published the proposal to introduce province flowers in the May 288, 1908 edition of the newspaper Stockholms Dagblad, and requested suggestions of species from the country's botanics. A list was put together on June 7, 1908, by professor Veit B. Wittrock from the Botanical Garden in Stockholm. Scania and Hälsingland violently opposed the plants that were selected to represent them; Scania was given European Beech but wanted oxeye daisy, while Hälsingland was given Scots Pine but wanted flax. Erik E:son Hammar, a pastor and politician in Sweden, granted the two provinces' wish to change their province flowers in 1909. There is still debate amongst several other provinces over which species should represent them and they have therefore been given two province flowers.

List

References

External links
Province flower delivery in Sweden
Vilda blommor i Sverige - Flowers in Sweden - Sweden wildflowers and native plants - information and pictures

Lists of flowers
Sweden geography-related lists
Province flowers